The Yurumanguí River is a river of Colombia. It drains into the Pacific Ocean.

See also
List of rivers of Colombia

References

Rivers of Colombia